Antonio Samac (born 30 July 1997) is a Croatian footballer currently playing for HNK Sloga Mravince.

Career 
Samac, the nephew of the former HNK Hajduk Split and FC Barcelona player Goran Vučević, started his career with NK Dugopolje before moving to the HNK Hajduk Split youth setup aged 10 He moved on to RNK Split aged 14, and featured in the team that won the Croatian U19 title in the 2014/15 season. In early 2016, he was sent on loan to the third-tier NK Junak Sinj until the end of the season along with teammates Marin Roglić and Toni Glavaš. He rejoined the RNK Split senior team the following summer.

In August 2019, Samac returned to RNK Split.

References

External links

1997 births
Living people
Footballers from Split, Croatia
Association football forwards
Croatian footballers
RNK Split players
NK Junak Sinj players
NK Novigrad players
NK Primorac 1929 players
Croatian Football League players
First Football League (Croatia) players